This is a list of Norwegian orders and medals, in order of precedence. This list contains all medals approved for wearing on a Norwegian military uniform in ranked order.

Group 1: Awarded by or approved by H.M. The King
Those awards presented by or approved by the King of Norway are worn in an order of precedence established by Royal Decree of 11 June 1943, with subsequent additions.

Royal Family Orders

  Royal Family Order of King Haakon VII of Norway (1906–1957)
  Royal Family Order of King Olav V of Norway (1957–1991)
   Royal Family Order of King Harald V of Norway (1991–current)

These are not worn on military uniform.

Group 2: Foreign state decorations
Decorations that are awarded or approved by foreign heads of state. They are ranked as follows: British, Danish, Finnish, Icelandic, Swedish, other countries are ranked alphabetically by their name in French.

Group 3: Decorations of UN, NATO, EU, OSCE and similar
Decorations from international operations led by UN, NATO and other international organisations. The Multinational Force and Observers Medal is also placed in this group, so was the formerly approved PLANELM Medal. Medals are ranked by the year a mission started, oldest first.

Group 4: Other Norwegian decorations

Group 5: Other foreign decorations
Foreign awards that do not fall into any of the groups above can be approved for use on Norwegian military uniform upon application. The order of wear as for group 2.

Group 6: Medals awarded for military skills
Since 2008, the old medals were no longer approved worn on military uniform, and got replaced by the following medals in 2012:
  Norwegian defence shooting badge
  Norwegian defence military sports badge

Military medals of skills
These decorations are most often divided in three classes: bronze, silver and gold. They are most often awarded as metal badges, but if the gold requirements are met over several years a medal is awarded:
  The military sharp shooting badge (shooting)
  The military marching badge (30 km march with gear)
  The military skiing badge (30 km skiing, including shooting)
  The military infantry badge (infantry skills)
  The military sports badge (military sports)
  The military penthathlon badge (Military pentathlon)

Since 2008, the above medals are no longer approved worn on military uniform. The requirements for these medals can be a part of earning the current military medals

Civilian medals of skills
These share most of the characteristics of the badges and medals awarded for military skills, but the requirements may vary more:
  Norwegian Civilian Marksmanship Association's merit badge (shooting)
  Norwegian Confederation of Sports Medal (sports)
  Norwegian Swimming Federation's «The big seahorse» (swimming)
  Norwegian Shooting Association's army rifle medal (NAIS-medal) (shooting)
  Norwegian Civilian Marksmanship Association's biathlon medal ( –1983) / Norwegian Biathlon Association's medal (1983– ) (biathlon)

Since 2008, the above medals are no longer approved worn on military uniform. The requirements for these medals can be a part of earning the current military medals.

Additional civilian skills medal no longer approved worn on military uniform:
  Norwegian Civilian Marksmanship Association's medal of shooting (gold), also known as DFS organization medal (shooting) – Old ribbon version, the current is the same as the silver medal.
  Norwegian Civilian Marksmanship Association's medal of shooting (silver), also known as DFS organization medal (shooting).

Foreign medals of skills
Foreign military and civilian skill medals are generally not permitted to be used on Norwegian military uniforms, unless permission has been applied and granted. Such skill medals then rank very last, after all other awards and skill marks.

The following foreign skill mark is approved:
  Cross for the Four Day Marches

Unit citations
The Norwegian Armed Forces does not have any unit citations.

Norwegian personnel who have fought in departments that have been honored with a foreign unit citation or unit award and who have received a ribbon as a sign of this, are allowed to wear these on Norwegian military uniform, but then separate from other ribbon stripes and located below these.

Unit citations in the form of ribbons are not worn with medals.

Examples of foreign unit citations given to Norwegian personnel:
  Republic of Korea Presidential Unit Citation, South Korea
  Army Meritorious Unit Commendation, USA
  Navy Presidential Unit Citation, USA
  Joint Meritorious Unit Award, USA

No longer awarded

The following obsolete awards are no longer approved on military uniform:
  The Royal Norwegian Order of the Norwegian Lion
  Military cross with sword
  Military cross
  Armed Forces Medal for Heroic Deeds with Golden Laurel Branch
 PLANELM Medal, awarded to the Planning Element staff in SHIRBRIG

The Military cross, in both versions, are since 2014 no longer approved worn on military uniform. Personnel still serving got it converted to other medals. Similarly has the Medal for International Operations with Golden Laurel Branch been converted for personnel still serving.

Approved worn on military uniform in the years 1961–1981:
  Norwegian Confederation of Sports' 100 Years Anniversary Medal

See also
 List of Norwegian Honours awarded to Heads of State and Royals
 List of honours of the Norwegian Royal Family by country

Notes

References

External links

 Norwegian Decorations
 Norwegian orders and medals 
 The Collection of Henrik Revens Website features orders and medals of Norway as well as other Nordic countries
 warsailors.com about the war medals
 A private page with very nice images
 medals.org.uk
 Decorations and Medals of the Kingdom of Norway
 A private page about Norwegian medals

 
Norway